Gajendra Singh Chauhan known professionally as Gajendra Chauhan, is a former television actor known for his work on Indian television, especially his portrayal of Yudhishthira in the historical television series Mahabharat (1988–90). He has also had significant roles in a few B movies, and a larger number of cameo appearances in other films. In 2015, he was appointed chairman of the Film and Television Institute of India (FTII), which sparked controversy and opposition by FTII students, leading to his resignation in October 2017.

Early life
Chauhan did a diploma in radiography from All India Institute of Medical Sciences (AIIMS) before he moved to Mumbai to pursue a career in acting. There he studied acting in the school run by Roshan Taneja, who had previously taught at FTII.

Acting career
Chauhan's acting career spans over 35 years, and by his own count, he has worked in 600 television series and almost 150 movies during that period. His first break as an actor was in television series Paying Guest in 1983, and he went on to act in shows such as Rajni, Air Hostess and Adalat. The first acting part in a film that he did was in Main Chup Nahi Rahoongi in 1986. In reviews of his film career, Times of India and Firstpost wrote that he had played significant roles only in a few "C-grade" movies, with most of his other roles being cameo appearances, a few of which were in mainstream movie.

Mahabharat 

Chauhan was initially offered to play the role of Lord Krishna in the television series, and shot for two episodes of the series in this role. However filming for the first series was delayed, and Chauhan moved south to take on new work. Upon his return, Chauhan had put on weight and was considered unsuitable for the role of Krishna. He was later offered the role of Yudhishthira, which went on to being the role he has become better known by.

Administration and politics
Chauhan has also been involved in the administration of Cinema and Television Artists Association for 20 years, and served as its president for a year. In 2004 Chauhan entered politics, and became a member of the Bharatiya Janata Party (BJP), for which he has worked as the national convener for culture.

Controversies
On 9 June 2015, Chauhan was appointed as the Chairman of the Film and Television Institute of India (FTII). His appointment proved to be controversial amid allegations by students that it was a blatant attempt to "saffronize the institute". A section of left-wing students association, including All India Students Association (AISA) (the student wing of the Communist Party of India (Marxist–Leninist) Liberation) continue to agitate. Chauhan requested the students to give him a year to prove himself, and insisted that he would be better than the previous chairpersons.

Among those who have supported Chauhan's appointment as FTII chairman are BJP supporters and politicians including Mukesh Khanna, Shatrughan Sinha, Paresh Rawal, Hema Malini, Rajyavardhan Singh Rathore, and Paintal. Many more including FTII alumni and former teachers, actors, film technicians, filmmakers, journalists and political leaders have opposed his appointment, prominent among whom include Ranbir Kapoor, Kalki Koechlin, Nawazuddin Siddiqui, Anupam Kher, Piyush Mishra, Anand Patwardhan, Kiran Rao, Jahnu Barua, Salman Khan, Rishi Kapoor, Resul Pookutty, Rajkummar Rao, Amol Palekar, Soumitra Chatterjee, Rahul Gandhi, Arvind Kejriwal and Rana Ayyub.

Filmography

Film

Television

References

External links 
 
 

Year of birth missing (living people)
Place of birth missing (living people)
Indian male film actors
Indian male television actors
Living people
People from Delhi
Bharatiya Janata Party politicians from Maharashtra